Andreas Mouratis (29 November 1926 – 10 December 2000), nicknamed Missouri, was a Greek footballer, who played for Olympiacos.

Career
He was the leading power in the Olympiakos team of the post-war era and won numerous league and cup titles. He was and still is one of the favourite Olympiakos players. Vigorous, aggressive and passionate, he embodies the ideal player characteristics for Olympiakos fans.

He made 16 appearances and scored one goal for the Greece national football team. He was also member of the national side for the 1952 Olympic Games, but he did not play in any matches.

Mouratis was nicknamed "Mourat Aslan" (Mouratis the Lion) by the Turkish press, after a friendly match of the national teams of Greece and Turkey, because he was playing aggressively like a lion.

Mouratis died at age 74.

Honours

Olympiacos
Panhellenic Championship: 1946–47, 1947–48, 1951–52, 1953–54, 1954–55
Greek Cup: 1946–47, 1950–51, 1951–52, 1952–53, 1953–54
Piraeus FCA Championship: 1946, 1947, 1948, 1949, 1950, 1951, 1952, 1953, 1954, 1955
 
Greek Military Team
World Military Cup: 1962

References

1926 births
2000 deaths
Greek footballers
Greece international footballers
Olympiacos F.C. players
Olympic footballers of Greece
Footballers at the 1952 Summer Olympics
Association football defenders
Mediterranean Games gold medalists for Greece
Mediterranean Games medalists in football
Footballers  at the 1951 Mediterranean Games
Footballers from Piraeus